The 1976 North Texas State Mean Green football team represented North Texas State University—now known as the University of North Texas—during the 1976 NCAA Division I football season. In its fourth season under head coach Hayden Fry, the team compiled a 7–4 record. The team played its home games at Fouts Field in Denton, Texas.

Schedule

Roster

Game summaries

at Mississippi State

at Texas

vs. SMU

Florida State

References

North Texas State
North Texas Mean Green football seasons
North Texas State Mean Green football